Andrzej Przeworski (11 February 1900 – 24 November 1952) - was a Polish footballer, referee and manager. He played in Cracovia (1914–1920, 1922–1926), WKS Warsaw (1920), Polonia Warsaw (1920–1922) and Legia Warsaw (1922). His debut in national team came on September 3, 1922, in 1–1 draw to Romania.

Family 
Przeworski's nephew Adam Przeworski is a Professor of Political Science at New York University.

References

Bibliography 

Polish footballers
MKS Cracovia (football) players
Polonia Warsaw players
Legia Warsaw players
1900 births
1952 deaths
Footballers from Kraków
Association football goalkeepers
Poland international footballers